Robert Comyn  (1672-1727) was an English priest in the first half of the 18th century.

Crosse  was born in East Ilsley and educated at Balliol College, Oxford. He migrated to University of Cambridge in 1693. Comyn held livings at Wigmore, Brampton Bryan, Pontesbury and Presteign. He was Archdeacon of Shropshire from 1713 to 1726.

References

People from West Berkshire District
1672 births
1727 deaths
Alumni of Balliol College, Oxford
Archdeacons of Shropshire
17th-century English Anglican priests
18th-century English Anglican priests